Euthyone melanocera is a moth of the subfamily Arctiinae first described by Schaus in 1899. It is found in Trinidad, Venezuela and Suriname.

References

Lithosiini